Events in the year 1815 in Portugal.

Incumbents
Monarch: Mary I

Events
26 December – Count of Barca, title created

Births
11 February – João Afonso da Costa de Sousa de Macedo, 1st Duke of Albuquerque (died 1890).

1 August – José Carlos O'Neill, titular head of the Clanaboy O'Neill dynasty (d 1887)

Deaths

Carlos Amarante, engineer and architect (b. 1748)

References

 
1810s in Portugal
Years of the 19th century in Portugal